Rudbar-e Shahrestan may refer to:

Rudbar-e Shahrestan District
Rudbar-e Shahrestan Rural District